The Blast is the first Indipop studio album by Indian musician Yuvan Shankar Raja, released in July 1999. It features 12 tracks, which were all composed by Yuvan Shankar Raja.

Production
Yuvan Shankar Raja started working on an independent studio album, even before stepping into the Tamil film industry, working as a film composer and music director. It was, in fact, this album, which made possible his entry into film business, since producer T. Siva approached and eventually assigned him to compose the score for his 1997 Tamil film Aravindhan, after having listened to a couple of tracks, Yuvan Shankar had composed from this album.

He worked for nearly 2 years on this album, which finally got released in July 1999. But since he wasn't popular and not a household name yet during the time, his album went totally unnoticed and failed to gain attraction, though featuring some very popular artists as actor Kamal Haasan, Carnatic-based singers Nithyashree Mahadevan, Unnikrishnan and Srinivas.

According to Yuvan Shankar Raja, the album is based on the thought of World Peace. He tells, that during the time, he was working on this album, India was carrying out Nuclear testing, which he had used as the inspiration, from which also the title is derived.

Track listing
 "Oli Veesum" — 6:09
 "Nee Thane" — 5:56
 "Chippikule Muthu Pookkal" — 5:43
 "Poovea Puthirae" — 3:50
 "Oru Naal" — 3:05
 "Mama Mama" — 6:52
 "Poradu Poradu Poovodu" — 5:45
 "Vaa Nanbane" — 3:38
 "Mama Mama" (Instrumental) — 6:51
 "Sonnare" — 5:56
 "Unn Ninaivai" — 4:21
 "Aval Devathai" — 2:24

Release history

Personnel
Following people are credited:
 Vocals:
 Yuvan Shankar Raja (tracks 1, 2, 3, 5, 7, 8, 10, 11, 12)
 Kamal Haasan (tracks 3, 8, 12)
 Rajalakshmi (track 3)
 Srinivas (track 4)
 Unnikrishnan (track 5)
 Nithyasree Mahadevan (track 5)
 Nagoor Hanifa (track 6)
 Lyrics:
 Sujatha
 Vasan
 Parthi Bhaskar
 Kavi Ravi

References

External links
 The Blast at MusicIndiaOnline

1999 debut albums
Yuvan Shankar Raja albums